Darul Musannefin Shibli Academy is a research academy based in Azamgarh, Uttar Pradesh, India.

History
Darul Musannefin Shibli Academy was conceived by Maulana Shibli Nomani and established by his disciples Hamiduddin Farahi, Syed Sulaiman Nadvi, Maulana Syed Masood Ali, Mawlana Abdus Salam Nadwi and Mawlana Shibli Mutakallim Nadwi on 21 November 1914, three days after his death with the following objectives:

 To nurture and sustain a body of scholarly authors.
 To provide a congenial environment for scholars to create, compile and translate literary works of high scholastic and historical value.
 To undertake printing and publication of the literary works of the Academy.

It aimed at effectively meeting increasing intellectual and ideological challenges faced by the Muslim community of the sub-continent after the collapse of their political authority and its replacement by the British power.

Financial difficulties
During the recent years due a combination of factors the Academy had been facing severe financial problems. Its precarious finances are barely adequate to maintain a skeletal staff on extremely meagre remuneration. Absolutely no funds are available for any kind of development plans. Even maintenance of basic services is not possible. Buildings have not seen repair and white wash for a long time and publication programme is badly affected. Modernisation of its famed library, preservation of rare manuscripts, publication of Hindi and English translations of its books and a number of other projects could not be undertaken due to the paucity of funds. Urgent help is needed to enable the Academy maintain its glorious tradition and continue to serve the community for which it was founded.

References

2. https://www.milligazette.com/news/1-community-news/11381-darul-musannefin-shibli-academy/ 

3.  https://m.timesofindia.com/city/varanasi/darul-musannefin-an-excellent-seat-of-learning/articleshow/45321427.cms  

Colleges in Azamgarh district
Education in Azamgarh
Shibli Nomani